Jennifer Ejoke, professionally known as Wavy the Creator (stylized as Wavy The Creator), is a recording artist, photographer, fashion designer and film-maker, born in Lagos, Southwest Nigeria and raised in the United States. She is best known for her song "H.I.G.H" and as the official photographer of Nigerian hip-hop artist Olamide.

Career
Wavy's began her career in 2017 as a performance photographer at the One Africa Musicfest concert in Houston, Texas, where she met Nigerian rapper Olamide. She eventually became his personal photographer and videographer under the name Wavy Film. Wavy moved back to Lagos in 2017 to collaborate on visual projects with Olamide. Shortly thereafter, she began to photograph other Nigerian musicians and released her fashion collection Azif.

In June 2017, Wavy launched her music career with the release of her debut single "H.I.G.H" (Her in Greater Heights), which resulted in an invitation to open for Skepta and his Boy Better Know crew at the Homecoming Africa concert in Lagos, performing alongside the likes of J Hus, Wizkid and Davido.

In January 2018, she released her sophomore single "Stay", and later in the same year,  she signed with Tinie Tempah's Disturbing London, releasing her debut single "Shaku" with the label. The single, which is a play on the popular Nigerian dance style known as Shaku-Shaku, was premiered and reviewed online by Vogue magazine.

In 2019, she released Interlude 3 featuring Zamir, a third installment of a series of interludes she released since her debut single. The interludes are a softer, more intimate creative expressions, which are different from her usual productions. Interlude 3 was produced by Genio Bambino and the visuals were produced and directed by TSE and SAN V.

In May 2019, Wavy the Creator released "Body Deep", a record produced by Dutch producer Spanker, alongside visuals courtesy of Nigerian director Meji Alabi.

Discography

Selected singles

References 

Living people
Year of birth missing (living people)
Nigerian musicians
Nigerian women fashion designers
Nigerian photographers
Residents of Lagos
Nigerian alté singers